Rena Riffel (born March 5, 1969) is an American actress, singer, dancer, model, writer, producer, and director.  She is known for her supporting roles in films such as Showgirls, Striptease, and Mulholland Drive.

Showgirls
Riffel landed her breakthrough role in the 1995 film Showgirls starring Elizabeth Berkley, Gina Gershon, and Kyle MacLachlan. Initially reading for the lead role of Cristal Connors, Riffel was cast in the supporting role of Penny/Hope after director Paul Verhoeven decided that she was too young to play an aging showgirl.

While on the set of Showgirls, Riffel approached the music supervisor with a song she recorded, "Deep Kiss". The music supervisor tested the song on the production office (without telling them it had been written by one of the actresses) to determine if it was suitable for the film. Director Paul Verhoeven listened to the song and decided to include it in the lap dance scene at the Cheetah strip club.

Although an initial box office failure, Showgirls enjoyed success in the home video market, generating more than $100 million in video rentals and became one of MGM's top 20 all-time best sellers.

For the 2004 re-release as a DVD limited edition box set, Riffel, along with cast members Lin Tucci and Patrick Bristow, had their hand prints and names put in cement in front of the Hollywood Vista Theater at the red carpet event where they were also interviewed by Access Hollywood. Riffel and Bristow were also special guests at Peaches Christ's Midnight Mass midnight screening of Showgirls in 2008 in San Francisco, California. They were interviewed on stage after the live performance of the Goddess volcano dance performed by drag queens in gold lamé and featuring Peaches Christ as Goddess.

When asked if she expected Showgirls to produce such a cult legacy, Riffel replied, "No. I went into it thinking it would be a really erotic, serious, shocking exposé. People would be sitting on the edge of their seats from suspense. [... But] some people were trying to play straight comedy – I played my character with comedy;  I was hoping to get a laugh – but no one was acting with tongue in cheek. I know that everyone went into it thinking it would be like Basic Instinct. [...] Maybe it's Verhoeven. Even [Basic Instinct] seems kind of campy now [...] I think it's something with European filmmakers. I think – and this is my theory – [...] that there's something that European filmmakers have, a punched-up, extreme vibe. Everything's extreme."

She is also quoted as saying, "Showgirls just keeps getting more and more popular, it's a total phenomenon.  I don't think a film could even try to have this afterlife happen to it. This cult status and celebration is all created by the fans and the people who saw something special in the film. I seem to be one of the only actors that represents and gets involved with the cult status. I think Elizabeth (Berkley) is still upset about how the film was received initially. I think she is brilliant in her role and she should have won best actress at some film festivals, and I think Joe Eszterhas's writing is remarkably brilliant. I suspect because the way they marketed the film, that is what led to the backlash. The marketing campaign was misleading. But at the end of the day, it all worked out for the best."

Entertainment Weekly'''s July 23, 2010 issue announced a sequel to Showgirls. Rena Riffel wrote, directed, and starred in the film, released in 2011. Initially entitled Showgirl, it was later renamed Showgirls 2: Penny's from Heaven.

Striptease

Following her role in Showgirls, Riffel was cast in Striptease with Demi Moore and Burt Reynolds. Showgirls was generally disliked and the filmmakers feared people would pre-judge Striptease for that reason. To avoid any association between the two films, advertisements projected Striptease as more comedic than Showgirls, which had been marketed as a drama.  Aside from a common context, Striptease and Showgirls shared two notable connections:  Marguerite Derricks choreographed both films, and Rena Riffel played a prominent role in each.

Widely considered a box office failure, Striptease lacked the momentum that Showgirls gained in its cult status and has subsequently been referred to as one of the worst movies ever made.

Mulholland Drive

In 2001, Riffel appeared in the David Lynch film Mulholland Drive.  When interviewed about the film and if she “got it”, Riffel replied, “See…I can’t remember.  No, I guess it still doesn’t make sense to me.  It’s been a while – I’d like to watch it again….one website put a lot of clarity on it with their theories.”

Czechsploitation, erotica and horror

After Striptease, Riffel accepted minor roles on the television series Married... with Children in 1997, and Clueless as well as the HBO movie Breast Men before making a string of films with European director Lloyd Simandl.  These movies, referred to by some as “Czechsploitation” films, include Dark Confessions, Bound Cargo, Caligula’s Spawn, and No Escape.  These films, coupled with Riffel’s roles in Showgirls and Striptease opened the door for her to be cast in a handful of erotic/thriller films such as The Pornographer and Scandalous Behavior (with Shannon Tweed).

In 1999, Riffel appeared in Citizens of Perpetual Indulgence, a gay-themed comedy/drama/art film.
Riffel also appeared in several horror/thriller movies including Candyman 3: Day of the Dead, Unstable Minds, and Dark Reel starring Edward Furlong and Tony Todd.

Musical work and other projects
According to the text trivia track on the 2010 Blu-ray release of Showgirls, one of the songs played during the film's lap-dance sequence was co-written by Riffel.

In 2004, Riffel’s song "Geisha Girl" was featured in Oliver Robbins film Wild Roomies. She also sang the theme song for 2007 E! Entertainment's series, Billionaire Heiresses, called "Livin' in the Fast Lane". In 2008, she starred in Coheed and Cambria's music video for "Feathers" playing the 1950s character, Judy Feathers. Judy Feathers is the perfect housewife with a secret of being a cannibal, killing then serving the milkman, postman, sailor, and a boyscout for dinner. It won Best Video in 2008 in the UK for the Kerrang! Awards and Rena appeared on Jimmy Kimmel Live! on March 5, 2008, with the band.

In 2008, Riffel directed, produced, wrote, and starred in the movie Trasharella, a comedy/crime/fantasy musical. She edited the film herself and her production company, Rena Riffel Films, released the film on DVD through Amazon.com in 2009.

When asked to describe Trasharella, Riffel stated, "It is a satire on B-movie horror films... I went against the grain and instead of trying to make this slick Hollywood film, I just let things be as they were and made it into a really bad grindhouse style exploitation film. ...it's not a dumb film, it's just 'bad'... in a good way. Mae West said: 'When I'm good I'm good, but when I'm bad I'm better.' And we use her quote in Trasharella."

Riffel developed a musical based on Showgirls, titled Showgirls! The Musical and also wrote and directed a sequel to Showgirls. The film had its first screening in October 27, 2011, at the Laemmle Theatre's Sunset 5 in West Hollywood, California. It played to a packed house who enjoyed the epic, which had a duration of 2 hours and 24 minutes. The film, now titled Showgirls 2: Penny's from Heaven received favorable reviews, with references made to David Lynch's Inland Empire by CraveOnline.com and LA Weekly. Showgirls 2: Penny's from Heaven was screened in arthouse theatres across the country and announced further surprise screenings on the movie website, ShowGirls2Movie.com.

Riffel is featured on the Velvet Revolver album Contraband.

Filmography

Actress

Television
 1988 Paradise (a.k.a. Guns of Paradise) episode "Childhood's End" as Teenage Prostitute
 1992 Freshman Dorm episode "My Boyfriend’s Back" as Lisa
 1995 Land's End episode "Land's End: Part 1" as Taffi Bishop
 1995 Land's End episode "Land's End: Part 2" as Taffi Bishop 
 1996 Minor Adjustments episode "The Model Wife" as Leslie
 1997 Married... with Children episode "How to Marry a Moron" as Stripper #1
 1997 Clueless episode "Sharing Cher" as Second Masseuse
 2000 The Pretender episode "Cold Dick" as Mona Jeffries
 2000 The X Show episode dated 26 January 2000 as herself
 2001 Spyder Games episode "Episode #1.56" as Lydia
 2001 Spyder Games episode "Episode #1.58" as Lydia
 2005 Dante's Cove episode "In the Beginning" as Tina
 2005 Dante's Cove episode "Then There Was Darkness" as Tina
 2008 Celebrity Rehab with Dr. Drew episode "Sex and Trauma" as herself

Producer
 2000 Between Christmas and New Year’s (associate producer)
 2009 Trasharella (producer)
 2009 The Making of Gnome Killer 2 (associate producer)
 2009 The Gertrude Stein Mystery (associate producer)
 2011 Trasharella Ultra Vixen (Producer)
 2011 Showgirls 2: Penny's from Heaven (Producer)
 2016 Astrid's Auto Portrait (Producer)

Composer
 1992 Back in the USSR 1995 Showgirls 1999 Bloodthirsty 2004 Roomies 2009 TrasharellaSoundtrack
 1995 Showgirls (writer and performer: "Deep Kiss")
 2004 Roomies (performer: "Geisha Girl")
 2007 Forbes 20 Billionaire Heiresses: Young, Fabulous and Incredibly Rich (performer: "Livin' in the Fast Lane" – theme song)
 2009 TrasharellaDirector
 2009 Trasharella 2011 Trasharella Ultra Vixen 2011 Showgirls 2: Penny's from Heaven 2016 Astrid's Auto PortraitWriter
 2009 Trasharella (screenplay) (story)
 2011 Showgirls 2: Penny's from Heaven 2016 Astrid's Auto PortraitCostume and wardrobe

Editor
 2009 Trasharella 2011 Trasharella Ultra Vixen 2011 ShowGirls2: Penny's from Heaven 2016 Astrid's Auto Portrait''

References

External links
Rena Riffel's Blog

Interview with Rena Riffel on (re)Search my Trash (September 2013)

American film actresses
Living people
1969 births
21st-century American singers
20th-century American singers
American television actresses
American women composers
20th-century American actresses
21st-century American actresses
American women film directors
American female dancers
American dancers
American women screenwriters
Female models from California
Film producers from California
Models from Los Angeles
20th-century American women singers
20th-century American composers
Film directors from Los Angeles
Screenwriters from California
American women film producers
21st-century American women singers
20th-century women composers